The Dealer is a 1966 album by jazz drummer/bandleader Chico Hamilton. It was first released by Impulse! Records (AS-9130) and has been subsequently reissued on CD with the addition of bonus tracks from Chic Chic Chico, Definitive Jazz Scene Vol. 3 and Passin' Thru. The bonus tracks feature different line-ups to that of the album, including Charles Lloyd and Gábor Szabó. The bonus track, "El Toro" is also featured on the Impulsive! Unmixed compilation.

All tracks are originals, composed by Hamilton and some arranged by Jimmy Cheatham. The exceptions are "For Mods Only", composed by free jazz saxophonist Archie Shepp, who features on the track playing piano; some licks played by guitarist, Larry Coryell, from which Mick Taylor (of Bluesbreakers and The Rolling Stones) later used with The Stones; and "Larry of Arabia" by Larry Coryell, here supposedly making his first recording.

Track listing
"The Dealer" (Chico Hamilton-Jimmy Cheatham) – 6:21
"For Mods Only" (Archie Shepp) – 4:25
"A Trip" (Chico Hamilton-Jimmy Cheatham) – 6:35
"Baby, You Know" (Chico Hamilton-Jimmy Cheatham) – 3:56
"Larry of Arabia" (Larry Coryell) – 5:09
"Thoughts" (Chico Hamilton) – 9:20
"Jim-Jeannie" (Chico Hamilton) – 5:48

Bonus Tracks
"Chic Chic Chico" (Manny Albam) - 2:49
"Big Noise From Winnetka" (Ray Bauduc-Bob Haggart-Bob Crosby-Gil Rodin) - 2:49
"The Second Time Around" (Jimmy Van Heusen-Sammy Cahn) - 3:12
"El Toro" (Chico Hamilton-Charles Lloyd-Gábor Szabó) - 2:49

Personnel
Original Album
Chico Hamilton Quartet:
Chico Hamilton - drums, percussion, vocal on #6
Larry Coryell - electric guitar
Arnie Lawrence - alto saxophone, except #5
Richard Davis - bass
Featuring:
Archie Shepp - piano on #2
Ernie Hayes - organ on #4 and #5
Jimmy Cheatham - arranger on #1 and #4, conductor on #3
Unknown - percussion and tambourine on #7

Bonus Tracks:
Chico Hamilton - drums
Albert Stinson - bass, vocal on #9
Willie Bobo - maracas on #8, cowbells on #9
Charles Lloyd - flute on #9 and #11, tenor saxophone on #10
Gábor Szabó - guitar on #8, #10 and #11
George Bohanon - trombone on #10, probably maracas and percussion on #11
Jimmy Woods - tenor saxophone on #8

Production
Bob Thiele - original producer
Bob Simpson - recording engineer (original album)
Rudy Van Gelder - recording engineer (bonus tracks)
Michael Cuscuna - reissue producer
Erick Labson remastering
Robert Flynn/Viceroy - cover design
Charles Shabacon - photographs
Hollis King - art direction
Edward O'Dowd - graphic design

Locations
Original album recorded at RCA Recording Studios, NYC
Bonus tracks recorded at Rudy Van Gelder Recording Studio, NJ
Remastered at MCA Music Media Studios

References 

Chico Hamilton albums
1966 albums
Impulse! Records albums
Albums produced by Michael Cuscuna
Albums produced by Bob Thiele
Albums conducted by Jimmy Cheatham
Albums arranged by Jimmy Cheatham